Nuthall F.C. was an English football club based in Nuthall, Nottinghamshire.

History
They competed in the Central Midlands League and the FA Vase.

References

Defunct football clubs in Nottinghamshire
Association football clubs disestablished in 1997
1997 disestablishments in England
Central Midlands Football League